Lúcio Flávio da Silva Oliva (born 29 August 1986), known as Lúcio Flávio, is a Brazilian footballer who plays as a forward.

Contract
 Brasiliense.

References

External links

1986 births
Living people
Brazilian footballers
Brazilian expatriate footballers
Expatriate footballers in South Korea
Brazilian expatriate sportspeople in South Korea
Campeonato Brasileiro Série B players
Campeonato Brasileiro Série C players
Campeonato Brasileiro Série D players
Rio Branco Sport Club players
Iraty Sport Club players
Veranópolis Esporte Clube Recreativo e Cultural players
Clube Náutico Marcílio Dias players
Boa Esporte Clube players
Brasiliense Futebol Clube players
Guaratinguetá Futebol players
Associação Atlética Ponte Preta players
Jeonnam Dragons players
Daejeon Hana Citizen FC players
ABC Futebol Clube players
São Bernardo Futebol Clube players
Operário Ferroviário Esporte Clube players
Paraná Clube players
Fortaleza Esporte Clube players
Esporte Clube São Bento players
Paysandu Sport Club players
Associação Ferroviária de Esportes players
Criciúma Esporte Clube players
Al-Shoulla FC players
Associação Portuguesa de Desportos players
K League 1 players
Saudi First Division League players
Expatriate footballers in Saudi Arabia
Brazilian expatriate sportspeople in Saudi Arabia
Association football forwards
People from Sorocaba
Footballers from São Paulo (state)